Sagat may refer to:

People
Sagat (name), includes a list of people with the given name and surname
Sagat (rapper), an American rapper from Baltimore, Maryland
Sagat (wrestler) (born 1990), Japanese pro-wrestler

Other uses
Sagat (Street Fighter), video game character
Sagat or zill, musical instrument
Società Azionaria Gestione Aeroporto Torino (SAGAT), Turin Caselle airport operator, in Turin, Italy
Ságat, a Sámi newspaper written in Norwegian published in Finnmark, Norway
sagat Egyptian finger cymbals

See also

 Sagit (disambiguation)
 Sagot (disambiguation)